Judith Sloan (born 22 November 1954) is an Australian economist.

Sloan was born in Melbourne. She has been teaching as a university professor at Flinders University and the Curtin Institute of Technology and is an honorary professorial fellow at the Melbourne Institute of Applied Economic and Social Research of the University of Melbourne. She served as a commissioner on the Australian government's Productivity Commission and the Australian Fair Pay Commission, and she was deputy chair of the Australian Broadcasting Corporation and is a former board director of the Lowy Institute.

Sloan sat on the boards of several companies, including Mayne Nickless, SGIO Insurance, Santos, Primelife (chair). The Australian federal government appointed her to the Australian Constitutional Convention 1998; she was a founding member of the group Conservatives for an Australian Head of State.

She writes for The Australian and is a frequent guest on the ABC talk show Q&A. An email leak in November 2018 revealed that Sloan earns A$357,000 for her work as contributing economics editor at The Australian.

References

1954 births
Living people
Australian economists
Australian women economists
The Australian journalists
Academic staff of the University of Melbourne
University of Melbourne women
Academic staff of Flinders University
Academic staff of Curtin University
Journalists from Melbourne
Australian women journalists
Australian columnists
Australian women columnists
Australian business and financial journalists
Women business and financial journalists